|}

The Prix d'Harcourt is a Group 2 flat horse race in France open to thoroughbreds aged four years or older. It is run over a distance of 2,000 metres (about 1¼ miles) at Longchamp in April.

History
The event is named in memory of Emmanuel d'Harcourt (1844–1928), a former president of the Société d'Encouragement. It was established in 1929, and was originally contested over 2,400 metres.

The Prix d'Harcourt was held at Auteuil in 1940, and at Maisons-Laffitte in 1943 and 1944. On the latter occasion its distance was 2,000 metres.

The race's distance was changed to 2,150 metres in 1946. It was cut to 2,100 metres in 1953, and to 2,000 metres in 1958. It reverted to 2,100 metres in 1961, and was extended to 2,200 metres in 1969.

The event was formerly staged a few weeks after the Prix Ganay. The dates of the two races were interchanged in 1971, and from this point the Prix d'Harcourt was run over 2,000 metres.

Records
Most successful horse (2 wins):
 Amfortas – 1931, 1932
 Djebel – 1941, 1942
 Skalleti - 2021, 2022

Leading jockey (5 wins):
 Yves Saint-Martin – Regent (1960), Allez France (1974), Liloy (1976), Welsh Term (1983), Strawberry Road (1985)

Leading trainer (10 wins):
 André Fabre – Saint Estephe (1986), Village Star (1988), Star Lift (1989), Creator (1990), Panoramic (1991), Freedom Cry (1995), Indian Danehill (2000), Manduro (2006), Cutlass Bay (2010), Cloth of Stars (2017)

Leading owner (6 wins):
 Daniel Wildenstein – Yelapa (1970), Allez France (1974), Liloy (1976), Grand Pavois (1987), Star Lift (1989), Freedom Cry (1995)

Winners since 1980

Earlier winners

 1929: Guy Fawkes
 1930: Florio
 1931: Amfortas
 1932: Amfortas
 1933: Taxodium
 1934: Assuerus
 1935: Mary Tudor
 1936: Bouillon
 1937: Le Duc
 1938: Victrix
 1939: Canot
 1940: Ksar El Srir
 1941: Djebel
 1942: Djebel
 1943: Tifinar
 1944: Un Gaillard
 1945: Priam
 1946: Oubanghi
 1947: Yong Lo
 1948: Pearl Diver
 1949: Goody
 1950: Violoncelle
 1951: Alizier
 1952: Piqu'avant
 1953: Faubourg
 1954: Gerocourt
 1955: Mahan
 1956: Tropique
 1957: Tapioca
 1958: Tanerko
 1959: Franc Luron
 1960: Regent
 1961: Drago
 1962: Vienna
 1963: Tang
 1964: Trac
 1965: Frontin
 1966: Sigebert
 1967: Cadmus
 1968: Carmarthen
 1969: Grandier
 1970: Yelapa
 1971: Caro
 1972: Pistol Packer
 1973: Toujours Pret
 1974: Allez France
 1975: Card King
 1976: Liloy
 1977: Kasteel
 1978: Monseigneur
 1979: Trillion
</div>

See also
 List of French flat horse races

References

 France Galop / Racing Post:
 galop.courses-france.com:
 1929–1949, 1950–1979, 1980–present
 france-galop.com – A Brief History: Prix d'Harcourt.
 galopp-sieger.de – Prix d'Harcourt.
 horseracingintfed.com – International Federation of Horseracing Authorities – Prix d'Harcourt (2019).
 pedigreequery.com – Prix d'Harcourt – Longchamp.

Open middle distance horse races
Longchamp Racecourse
Horse races in France
1929 establishments in France
Recurring sporting events established in 1929